The Diebold 10xx (or Modular Delivery System, MDS) series is a third and fourth generation family of automated teller machines manufactured by Diebold.

History
Introduced in 1985 as a successor to the TABS 9000 series, the 10xx family of ATMs was re-styled to the "i Series" variant in 1991, the "ix Series" variant in 1994, and finally replaced by the Diebold Opteva series of ATMs in 2003.

The 10xx series of ATMs were also marketed under the InterBold brand; a joint venture between IBM and Diebold.  IBM machines were marketed under the IBM 478x series.  Not all of the 10xx series of ATMs were offered by IBM.

Diebold stopped producing the 1000-series ATM's around 2008.

Listing of 10xx Series Models
Members of the 10xx Series included:

MDS Series - Used a De La Rue cash dispensing mechanism
1060 - Mono-function, indoor counter-top unit with single cash cartridge cash dispenser
1062 - Multi-function, indoor lobby unit
1072 - Multi-function, exterior "through-the-wall" unit
i Series - Used an ExpressBus Multi Media Dispenser (MMD) cash dispensing mechanism
1060i - Mono-function, indoor counter-top unit with single cash cartridge cash dispenser
1061i - Mono-function, indoor counter-top unit with single cash cartridge cash dispenser
1062i - Multi-function, indoor lobby unit
1064i - Mono-function, indoor cash dispenser
1070i - Multi-function, exterior "through-the-wall" unit with a longer "top-hat throat" 
1072i - Multi-function, exterior "through-the-wall" unit
1073i - Multi-function, exterior "through-the-wall" unit, modified for use while sitting in a car
1074i - Multi-function, exterior unit, designed as a stand-alone unit for use in a drive-up lane.
ix Series - Used an ExpressBus Multi Media Dispenser (MMD) cash dispensing mechanism
1062ix - Multi-function, indoor lobby unit
1063ix - Mono-function, indoor cash dispenser with a smaller screen than the 1064ix
1064ix - Mono-function, indoor cash dispenser
1070ix - Multi-function, exterior "through-the-wall" unit
1071ix - Mono-function, exterior cash dispenser
1072ix - Multi-function, exterior "through-the-wall" unit
1073ix - Multi-function, exterior "through-the-wall" unit, modified for use while sitting in a car
1074ix - Multi-function, exterior unit, designed as a stand-alone unit for use in a drive-up lane.
1075ix - Multi-function, Exterior unit
1077ix - Mono-function, exterior "through-the-wall" unit

See also
List of Diebold products
List of IBM products

References

External links
  - Diebold : A Field Guide to Diebold ATMs (via Internet Archive)

Automated teller machines
Embedded systems
Diebold